Robert Zabrecky (born June 2, 1968, in Burbank, California) is an American actor, author, magician, and songwriter. His career began as a musician while being the front man for the band Possum Dixon. In the later years of his career, he has found success as a magician, actor, and author.

Life and career
Zabrecky was born and raised in Burbank, California. From 1989 to 1999 he was the singer-songwriter and bassist for the Los Angeles group Possum Dixon. The band, originally hailing from Silver Lake, released three albums during the 1990s.

During the mid-1990s, he began practicing magic and has since become a magician at the Magic Castle in Hollywood, California. In the mid-2000s he began a career in acting and has since landed roles in films and television programs.

Actor
In 2017, Zabrecky landed a supporting role in the supernatural drama, A Ghost Story. His film credits also include a supporting role in Ryan Gosling's directorial debut Lost River, playing the master of ceremonies at an underground fetish nightclub, and a starring role in the psychological thriller, Decay, portraying a troubled theme park groundskeeper who falls in love with a corpse. As a television actor he has made several appearances in popular shows including GLOW, Strange Angel, Criminal Minds, CSI: NY, Comedy Bang! Bang! and Angie Tribeca. He has also appeared in several short films and a wide range of television commercials.

He graduated from a two-year training program at Theatre West, where he appeared in theatrical adaptations of the television classic, The Twilight Zone and other productions.

In 2019, Zabrecky and his wife Tommi Zabrecky created the supernatural comedy series, The Other Side with Zabrecky. In each episode, Zabrecky invites guests into his home to participate in a séance to contact a departed spirit of their choice. Guests have included Jack Black, Jason Sudeikis, Kate Flannery, Will Forte, and David Arquette. The program is featured on the online visual arts magazine Night Flight.

Author
In June 2019 Zabrecky released his memoir, Strange Cures (RothCo Press).

Magician
Zabrecky is best known for an aberrant magician character he portrays by combining irreverent dark humor, mentalism and an artful use of elongated pauses in performances. He was taught under the guidance of Robert Daven, another member of the Castle. In 2011 and 2012 he was voted "Stage Magician of the Year" by the Academy of Magical Arts at the Magic Castle. In 2014 and 2015 he was voted "Parlour Magician of the Year" by the same organization.

After his music career ended he has worked throughout the United States, Japan and Europe as a magician. Since 2002 he has been a regular performer at the Magic Castle, where he formed the magic trio, The Unholy Three in 2003. He has also been the featured magician at annual magic conventions worldwide and appeared on the cover of magic-related journals and periodicals including Genii, Reel Magic and the Mandala.

The Zabrecky Hour, a one-man variety show, directed by John Lovick and Tommi Zabrecky, was premiered and developed at the Steve Allen Theater from 2010 to 2016. The show featured highlights from his Magic Castle act, song & dance, conversations with the moon and audience interaction.

After Zabrecky performed on Penn & Teller's Penn & Teller: Fool Us in August 2016, Penn Jillette said "We were trying to think if there's ever been a mentalist doing a mentalist act that was sincerely funny and sincerely good. You may be the first ever."

Musician
As the frontman for Possum Dixon, Zabrecky became a notable figure in the early 1990s emerging Silver Lake independent music community. During those years he wrote, recorded and performed with several musicians and producers including Beck, Earle Mankey, Tom Rothrock, Pleasant Gehman, Carla Bozulich, Tim O'Heir and others.

In 1998, Zabrecky, with Possum Dixon, released New Sheets, which would be the last album by the band. The LP, produced by Ric Ocasek, featured co-written material with Jane Wiedlin, Charlotte Caffey, Dave Stewart and Pat MacDonald. Shortly after the breakup of Possum Dixon he spent time singing for the Los Angeles art rock band, Human Hands and played bass in a Gun Club tribute band alongside original members Ward Dotson and Terry Graham.

In early 2010 he appeared on-stage with Maria McKee at a fund raiser in Hollywood. The pair sang a duet to Lou Reed's "Satellite of Love". The pair performed the song again as part of a Night of Zabrecky performance at the Steve Allen Theater in 2012.

Auctioneer
He is a skilled auctioneer, trained by Bonhams auction house (known then as Butterfield & Butterfield) during the late 1990s. For over a decade he has helped organizations such as the Silverlake Conservatory of Music, Beyond Baroque Literary Arts Center, The Leukemia & Lymphoma Society, Laguna Art Museum and many others with fundraising events.

Personal life
Zabrecky lives with his wife, Tommi Zabrecky, whom he married in 1998.

Works
Memoir
Strange Cures (2019)
The Feral Boy Who Lives in Griffith Park contributor (2019)

Publications
 Music for Deaf People chapbook (1992)
 Smartish Pace Art/Poetry Journal (contributor)
 The Underground Guide to Los Angeles (contributor)
 Stories of Famous Magicians (contributor)
 Secrets of My Friends 2 (contributor)
 MAGIC, The Magazine for Magicians (contributor)
 M-U-M, The Society of American Magicians (contributor)
 An Exploration at the Intersection of Magic and Theater (2010)
 Genii – The Conjuror's Magazine (Cover Feature, April 2013)
A,B,Z's of Magic, (2019) Vanishing Inc

Interviews
Dana Gould Hour Podcast, 2019.
Boo Crew Podcast, 2019
Monster Party, Apple Podcast, 2019
Hollywood Anonymous, Apple Podcast, 2019Three Thousand, MelbourneThe Magic Newswire, 2012The Avant/Garde Diaries, 2012Dan & Dave, 2012The Alibi; Illusion Noir, 2012Los Angeles Times, 2011Pop Culture: Sweet Tea Pumpkin Pie, 2011Carson Daly, 2010''

Awards and nominations
 1999 LA Weekly Award for Best Pop/Rock Band (Award)
 1999 California Music Awards (Award)
 2008 Parlour Magician of the Year, Academy of Magical Arts (Nomination)
 2009 Parlour Magician of the Year, Academy of Magical Arts (Nomination)
 2010 Parlour Magician of the Year, Academy of Magical Arts (Nomination)
 2010 Stage Magician of the Year, Academy of Magical Arts (Nomination)
 2011 Lecturer of the Year, Academy of Magical Arts (Nomination)
 2011 Stage Magician of the Year, Academy of Magical Arts (Award)
 2012 Stage Magician of the Year, Academy of Magical Arts (Award)
 2014 Parlour Magician of the Year, Academy of Magical Arts (Award)
 2015 Parlour Magician of the Year, Academy of Magical Arts (Award)
 2016 Lecturer of the Year, Academy of Magical Arts (Award)
 2017 Lecturer of the Year, Academy of Magical Arts (Award)

References

External links

Dancing Like a Motherf*cker With Rob Zabrecky, 2010 Interview
Rob Zabrecky 2008 Interview by Ross Anthony
Rob Zabrecky 1998 Interview
LA Weekly Story and Interview with Rob Zabrecky
Rock Magicians | LA Weekly Article
LA Weekly Article on Silverlake Artists featuring Rob Zabrecky
International Brotherhood of Magicians – Magic Castle Nominations

1968 births
Living people
21st-century American male actors
American male film actors
American male television actors
Male actors from Burbank, California
American magicians
American rock singers
Singers from California
Musicians from Burbank, California
American alternative rock musicians
Alternative rock bass guitarists
American indie rock musicians
American memoirists
American people of Scottish descent
Academy of Magical Arts Lecturer of the Year winners
Academy of Magical Arts Parlour Magician of the Year winners
Academy of Magical Arts Stage Magician of the Year winners